The Roman exploration of the Nile River under Nero was a Roman attempt to reach the sources of the Nile River. It was organized by emperor Nero in 60–61 AD.

History
Emperor Nero around 61 AD sent a small group of praetorian guards to explore the sources of the Nile River in Africa. He did this in order to obtain information for a possible conquest of  Ethiopia, as was called Equatorial Africa (and everything south of Egypt) by the Romans. 
The Roman legionaries navigating the Nile from southern Egypt initially reached the city of Meroë and later moved to the Sudd, where they found huge difficulties in going further.

Seneca wrote about this exploration and detailed that the sources were from a big lake in central Africa, south of the swamp region now called "the Sudd" in South Sudan. But other Roman historians, such as Pliny, suggest that the exploration was done in order to prepare a conquest of Ethiopia by Nero's legions.

However, the death of Nero prevented further explorations of the Nile as well as a possible Roman conquest south of their Roman Egypt.

Some historians suggest that the Roman legionaries of Nero probably reached the Murchison Falls in Uganda (but there is a major controversy about this very difficult achievement).

Accounts of Seneca and Pliny
Accounts are found in Seneca the Younger (VI.8.3) and Pliny (Natural History, VI.XXXV, p. 181-187):

The Roman legionaries navigating the Nile from southern Egypt initially reached the city of Meroe and later moved to the Sudd, where they found huge difficulties to going further.

The small group of praetorian guards reported back to Nero that, "we personally saw two rocks from which an immense quantity of water issued", according to Seneca. Some modern historians, such as  Giovanni Vannini, argue that this place is the Murchison Falls in northern Uganda, meaning that the Romans may have reached equatorial Africa, though this is debated. 

Furthermore, historian David Braund wrote, in 2015, that probably Nero's expedition to the Nile's sources opened a new route toward the Indian Ocean, bypassing the dangers of piracy in the Red Sea area while allowing future Roman commerce toward India and Azania.

See also
 Romans in sub-Saharan Africa

References

Further reading 
 Emma Buckley, Martin Dinter. A Companion to the Neronian Age. Publisher John Wiley & Sons. Oxford, 2013  
 

Nero
Exploration of Africa
Nile
History of South Sudan